Miloš Trifunović may refer to: 

 Miloš Trifunović (politician) (1871–1951), Serbian and Yugoslav politician 
 Miloš Trifunović (footballer) (born 1984), Serbian footballer

Human name disambiguation pages